Another Time, Another Place is a 1983 British drama film directed by Michael Radford and starring Phyllis Logan, Giovanni Mauriello and Denise Coffey. The screenplay was based on the 1983 novel by Jessie Kesson.

Plot
In Scotland in 1943 during World War II, Janie (Phyllis Logan) is a young Scottish housewife married to Dougal (Paul Young), who is 15 years older. Participating in a war rehabilitation program, the couple take in three Italian prisoners of war to work on their farm. Janie soon falls in love with one of the three, Luigi (Giovanni Mauriello). She begins a secret relationship with Luigi that is doomed from the start.

Cast
 Phyllis Logan – Janie
 Giovanni Mauriello – Luigi
 Denise Coffey – Meg
 Tom Watson – Finlay
 Gianluca Favilla – Umberto
 Gregor Fisher – Beel
 Paul Young – Dougal
 Claudio Rosini – Paolo
 Jennifer Piercey – Kirsty
 Yvonne Gilan – Jess
 Carol Ann Crawford – Else
 Ray Jeffries – Alick
 Scott Johnston – Jeems
 Nadio Fortune – Antonio
 David Mowat – Randy Bob
 Colin Campbell – Accordionist
John Francis Lane – Farmer
 Corrado Sfogli – Raffaello
 Peter Finlay – Officer
 Stephen Gressieux – Prisoner of War

References

External links 
 

1983 films
British war drama films
1980s war drama films
1980s English-language films
1980s Italian-language films
Films directed by Michael Radford
World War II prisoner of war films
Films set in Scotland
Films based on British novels
1983 drama films
British World War II films
1983 directorial debut films
1980s British films